Nygård is a neighbourhood in the city centre of Bergen in Vestland county, Norway.  It is located south of the Lille Lungegårdsvannet lake in the city centre and north of the Møhlenpris neighborhood. Grieghallen, St. Jacob's Church, and parts of the University of Bergen are located in Nygård.

See also
 Nordnes
 Sydnes
 Verftet
 Møhlenpris

References

Traditional neighbourhoods of Bergen